Crailsheim is a town in the German state of Baden-Württemberg. The city's main attractions include two Evangelical churches, a Catholic church, and the 67 metre tower of its town hall.

History
Crailsheim is famed for withstanding a siege by forces of three imperial cities - Schwäbisch Hall, Dinkelsbühl, and Rothenburg ob der Tauber - lasting from 1379 until 1380, a feat which it celebrates annually. Crailsheim became a possession of the Burgrave of Nuremberg following the siege. In 1791 it became part of the Prussian administrative region, before returning to Bavaria in 1806 and becoming a part of Württemberg in 1810.

Crailsheim's railroad and airfield were heavily defended by the Waffen-SS during World War II. Following an American assault in mid-April 1945, the town was occupied briefly by US forces before being lost to a German counter-offensive. Intense US bombing and artillery shelling destroyed much of the city, with subsequent fires consuming its historic inner city. Only the Johanneskirche (St. John's Church) escaped unharmed.

Crailsheim became the postwar home to the U.S. Army's McKee Barracks until the facility closed in January 1994.

Major employers in the Crailsheim area include:
 Voith
 Syntegon Technology GmbH
 Gerhard Schubert GmbH

The following boroughs comprise the Crailsheim municipality: Altenmünster, Erkenbrechtshausen, Tiefenbach, Onolzheim, Roßfeld, Jagstheim, Westgartshausen, Goldbach, Triensbach and Beuerlbach.

Transportation

Crailsheim is served by the Upper Jagst Railway.

Twin towns – sister cities

Crailsheim is twinned with:
 Biłgoraj, Poland
 Jurbarkas, Lithuania
 Pamiers, France
 Worthington, United States

Crailsheim Merlins
The Crailsheim Merlins are the city's basketball team.  Founded in 1986, they originally played in lower leagues. In 1995 they moved into a new sports hall, improved, and were promoted in 2001 to the 2. Bundesliga, the second division of German basketball. In 2015 they were first promoted to the Bundesliga but relegated after two seasons. They achieved promotion again in 2018.
www.crailsheim-merlins.de

Notable people
Hans Sachs (1874–1947), member of Reichstag
Kurt Schneider (1887–1967), psychiatrist
Karl Waldmann (1889–1969), NSDAP-politician
Eugen Grimminger (1892–1986), Member of White Rose
Inge Aicher-Scholl (1917–1998), author
Hans Scholl (1918–1943), founding member of the White Rose resistance movement in Nazi Germany
Werner Utter (1921–2006), one of the first flight captains of the Lufthansa after World War II
Eva Schorr (1927–2016), painter and composer
Wolfgang Meyer (1954–2019), clarinetist
Sabine Meyer (born 1959), clarinetist
Susanne Bay (born 1965), politician (The Greens), member of Landtag 
Philipp Gottfried Alexander (born 1970), 10th Prince of Hohenlohe-Langenburg
Alexander Neidlein (born 1975), politician (NPD)

References

External links
Official website 
History about Crailsheim 

Schwäbisch Hall (district)
Württemberg